The Brazilian Marine Corps (CFN), is the land combat branch and amphibious branch of the Brazilian Navy.
The Corps is specialised in amphibious warfare.

Mission 
Deployed nationwide, along the coast, in the riverine regions of Amazon and in the Pantanal, in peacetime it provides for the security of Naval installations and aids isolated populations through civic action programs in the Naval Districts. Abroad, it provides security for the Embassies of Brazil in Algeria, in Paraguay, in Haiti and in Bolivia. It has participated in all of the armed conflicts in the Military history of Brazil, foreign and domestic.

The badge consists of a fouled anchor superimposed over a pair of crossed rifles. It is worn on the collar points of the dress and service uniforms and on the corps Garrison Cap (Gorro de Fita).

History

The Royal Brigade of the Navy 
The Brazilian Marines trace their origin to 1808 when the troops of the Royal Brigade of the Navy (the Portuguese Marine Corps) arrived in Brazil (then a Portuguese colony) when Mary I of Portugal and her son Prince Regent John (later King John VI of Portugal) relocated themselves to the Portuguese South American territory during the Napoleonic Wars in Europe.

The baptism of fire: the conquest of Cayenne 
In retaliation for the invasion of Portugal, prince regent, Dom João ordered the invasion of French Guiana, whose capital, Cayenne, was captured on January 14, 1809.

Historical campaigns 

After Brazilian independence the force received many names and underwent various reorganisations. It was involved in several wars and campaigns: the War of the Independence of Brazil,  conflicts in the River Plate basin, and the Paraguayan War.  During the latter the Corps won distinction in both the Battle of Riachuelo and in the taking of Humaitá.

United Nations service 
The CFN if has participated in the humanitarian actions promoted by UN in such diverse theatres of operation as Bosnia, Honduras, Mozambique, Rwanda, Angola, East Timor and currently in Haiti (MINUSTAH).

The Corps today

Staff and mission 
With about 15,000 men, all volunteers, professionals in combat on land, air and sea, its mission is to guarantee the projection of the naval power on land, by means of landings from Navy ships and helicopters. The Corps is an integral part of the Navy, encompassing about one third of its manpower. Ranks are naval instead of Army, with the exception of Privates, who are called Soldados (Soldiers).

This last one includes the Brazilian Amazon. To cover climates and natural landscapes so diversified as Pampas of Rio Grande do Sul, pantanal of Mato Grosso do Sul, deserts of the Northeast region and  Amazon rainforest, demands a training of the highest standards, agility and versatility. Therefore, there are units trained in demolition techniques, special operations, combat in forests, mountain and ice, and helicopter-transported operations.

Trained as a Fast Deployment Unit, recently, with the sending of Brazilian military observers, also integrating the Peacekeeping Forces of the United Nations, the Marines have made their presence in distinctive areas of conflict as El Salvador, Bosnia, Angola, Moçambique, Ruanda, Peru, Ecuador, East Timor and currently Haiti.

On March 30, 2014 security forces in Rio de Janeiro occupied since the dawn of that day, the set of Shantytown Tide in the North Zone of Rio. Region is being prepared to receive the Pacifying Police Unit (UPP), Brazilian Marine Corps will provide support with 21 armored vehicles and 500 men.

Organization
The Corps headquarters is located in Fortaleza de São José, Ilha das Cobras, Rio de Janeiro.

Fleet Marine Force
The Fleet Marine Force (Força de Fuzileiros da Esquadra (FFE), literally Squadron Riflemen Force) includes the expeditionary component of the corps and consists of the following units:
1st Amphibious Division (Divisão Anfíbia (DivAnf)) of brigade size with three marine infantry battalions (Batalhão de Fuzileiros Navais (BFN) as its main fighting force, along with the following:
Command and Control Battalion (Batalhão de Comando e Controle),
1st "Riachuelo" Marine Infantry Battalion (BFN)
2nd "Humaitá" Marine Infantry Battalion (BFN)
3rd "Paissandu" Marine Infantry Battalion (BFN)
Marine Artillery Battalion (Batalhão de Artilharia de Fuzileiros Navais)
Marine Armoured Vehicle Battalion (Batalhão de Blindados)
Marine Tactical Air Control and Air Defence Battalion (Batalhão de Controle Aerotático e Defesa Antiaérea)
Governor's Island Marine Base (Base de Fuzileiros Navais da Ilha do Governador),
Reinforcement Troop (Tropa de Reforço (TrRef)) located in Ilha das Flores in São Gonçalo (RJ), composed of the following:
Marine Engineer Battalion (Batalhão de Engenharia de Fuzileiros Navais),
Marine Logistic Battalion (Batalhão Logístico de Fuzileiros Navais),
Amphibious Vehicles Battalion (Batalhão de Viaturas Anfíbias),
Police Company (Companhia de Polícia)
Landing Support Company (Apoio ao Desembarque) 
Isle of Flowers Marine Base (Base de Fuzileiros Navais da Ilha das Flores),

Landing Troop Command (Comando da Tropa de Desembarque (ComTrDbq)), located at Duque de Caxias (RJ) - provides the means to command, control and administer the Command of the Fleet Marine Force and to also local units
 Marine Special Operations Battalion "Tonelero" (Batalhão de Operações Especiais de Fuzileiros Navais (Batalhão Tonelero)) A unit similar to US Marine Corps Raiders, formed in 1957 and structured for high risk operations. Its mission is to destroy or damage prominent objectives in heavily defended areas, capture or rescue personnels or equipment, seize installations, obtain information, mislead and produce psychological effects.
Rio Meriti Marine Base (Base de Fuzileiros Navais do Rio Meriti (BFNRM)), located in Duque de Caxias (RJ)
ships detachments

Regional Forces
"Marine Groups" (Grupamentos de Fuzileiros Navais (GptFN) are subordinate to the Naval Districts (Distritos Navais), for the security of naval installations, as well as performing operations in support of the Naval District where they are assigned, while the 7th Marine Group is also tasked for public duties in the Brasilia area. They are located in the vicinity of the local Naval District headquarters. GptFNs are small-sized Marine battalions. 

Three of the GptFNs have been expanded into Batalhoes de Operacoes Ribeirinhas (Riverine Operations Battalions) or BtlOpRibs consisting of a Command and Services Company, 3 Marine Companies, and a Combat Support Company. 

 GptFN at Rio de Janeiro, RJ (1st DN)
 GptFN at Salvador, Bahia (2nd DN)
 GptFN at Natal, Rio Grande do Norte (3rd DN)
 2nd BtlOpRib at Belém, Pará (4th DN)
 GptFN at Rio Grande, Rio Grande do Sul (5th DN)
 3rd BtlOpRib at Ladário, Mato Grosso do Sul (6th DN)
 GptFN  at Brasília, Distrito Federal (7th DN)
 GptFN at São Paulo, São Paulo (8tht DN) (in formation)
 1st BtlOpRib, Manaus, Amazonas (9th DN)

Music

Musical support is rendered by the Central Band of the Marine Corps and the Marine Pipes, Drum and Bugle Corps in Rio de Janeiro (1st ND), the Brasilia Marine Corps Band (7th Naval District) and by the Marine Bands of each of the other Naval Districts.

Central Band of the Marine Corps
The Central Band of the Brazilian Marine Corps is the concert band unit of the CFN. Also known by its other name, the Symphonic Band of the CFN, it is the premier band of the CFN and is the senior most concert band in the armed forces. Their performances are marked by a balanced mix of popular and classical, as well as instrumental and sung songs. It is composed of two officers (the Director of Music and Bandmaster) and 118 military musicians who are NCOs. The band was created in the 1970s and belongs to the Band Company of the Naval Battalion, located at São José Fortress on Cobras Island, Rio de Janeiro.

Pipes, Drum and Bugle Corps
The Pipes, Drum and Bugle Corps is the official marching band of the CFN and one of the only field bands in service in the Brazilian Navy. Although it is based in Rio de Janeiro, it has taken part in all parades held in the federal capital of Brasilia, since 1960. It is notable for its use of the bagpipe, bugles, marching percussion, and the Turkish crescent in its ranks. The BMPDC has been deployed to many countries in its 100-year history, such as the United Kingdom to take part in the Coronation of Elizabeth II and France in 2005 for the Bastille Day military parade. It has also taken part in many domestic events such as the 2011 Military World Games and the 2016 Summer Olympics. The pipe portion of the BMPDC has been trained by pipe units and institutions in the United Kingdom such as the Army School of Bagpipe Music and Highland Drumming.

Methods 

To fulfill its missions, the Marines land off the ships of the Brazilian Navy, be it using landing boats, amphibious vehicles or helicopters. For this, they count on the support of the navy and/or sea and air support.

On land, it operates its normal way, which includes tanks, field artillery, antiaircraft artillery, combat engineering, communications and electronic warfare.

Training 

New recruits to the Corps must pass a rigorous physical training program, normally with many runs, calisthenics, sleep deprivation, swimming while holding their breath, practice shooting with diverse armaments, especially metal rings, rappeling and, in some cases, combat simulations, and when they passed all these then they achieve primary qualification as soldiers of the Corps and thus capable to fulfill the missions and responsibilities assigned to the Corps.

Uniforms 

The Brazilian Marines wear the variation of the Brazilian Lizard Pattern, known as navy lizard.
Vests: The marines for a long time used the IBA "Interceptor body armor" in woodland, but they are now being replaced by Eagle industries Maritime Ciras with Woodland Cover, and Black for SOF.
For the Comandos Anfibios is also issued a green version and black version of the WTC Recon Plate Carrier.
Boot: They use Atlas Atalaia combat boots, in coffee brown.

Ranks

Gallery

Main Equipment

Light tank

Infantry fighting vehicles

Artillery

Anti-aircraft missiles

Radar

Vehicles

Unmanned aerial vehicle

Motorcycle

Individual weapons and equipment

Pistols

Submachine guns

Rifles

Machine guns

Grenade launchers

Anti-armor

Historical equipment

See also 

 Marines
 Naval infantry
 Submarine Development Program

References

External links 

  (in Portuguese only)
 Fleet Marine Force website (in Portuguese only)

Commands of the Brazilian Armed Forces
Brazilian Navy
 
Marines
Military units and formations established in 1808